Leon Harry Gavin (February 25, 1893 – September 15, 1963) was a Republican member of the U.S. House of Representatives from Pennsylvania.

Biography
Leon H. Gavin was born in Buffalo, New York, and moved to Oil City, Pennsylvania, in 1915.  During the First World War he served in the United States Army as a sergeant in the Fifty-first Infantry Regiment of the 6th Infantry Division.  He served on the Defense Council of Venango County, Pennsylvania.  He was a member of the State Board of Appeals of the Selective Service System, the executive secretary of the Oil City Chamber of Commerce, and a member of the National Migratory Bird Conservation Commission from 1958 to 1963.

He was elected as a Republican to the 78th United States Congress and to the ten succeeding Congresses and served from January 3, 1943 until his death from a cerebral hemorrhage in Washington, D.C. on September 15, 1963. He is interred in Arlington National Cemetery. Gavin voted in favor of the Civil Rights Acts of 1957 and 1960, as well as the 24th Amendment to the U.S. Constitution.

See also
 List of United States Congress members who died in office (1950–99)

References

External links

The Political Graveyard

1893 births
1963 deaths
Politicians from Buffalo, New York
Burials at Arlington National Cemetery
United States Army personnel of World War I
Military personnel from Pennsylvania
People from Venango County, Pennsylvania
Republican Party members of the United States House of Representatives from Pennsylvania
20th-century American politicians